James E. Henry (April 21, 1831 Lyman, New Hampshire - 1912) was an American logging executive.

Life 
In 1881, he was owner of a sawmill in Zealand, New Hampshire.  He clear cut timber and operated charcoal kilns. In 1885, he built the Zealand Valley Railroad. He created the company town of Lincoln, New Hampshire. He built pulp mills and paper mills.

Legacy 
In 1911, the Weeks Act was passed, allowing government purchase of forest land.

Further reading

References 

1912 deaths
1831 births
Logging in the United States
People from New Hampshire